Hank Fort (née Hankins, 1908–1973) was an American singer and songwriter of the mid 20th century. She composed over 400 songs, including tracks recorded by Petula Clark ("Put Your Shoes On, Lucy") and The Andrews Sisters ("I Didn't Know the Gun Was Loaded").  One of her songs, "Look With Pride On Our Flag", was played at the second inauguration of Richard Nixon in 1973. In 1935 she established a dancing school in Nashville called "Fortnightly" which became a milestone for generations of youngsters coming of age to learn ballroom dancing and proper manners. It remained in existence nearly a quarter-century.

Early life
Hank Fort was born as Eleanor Hankins on June 19, 1908, in Nashville, Tennessee. She was known by the nickname "Hank". Her father, Cornelius Hankins (1863–1946), was a portrait artist. He studied with Robert Henri (leader of the "Ashcan School") and with William Merritt Chase in New York. Hankins'  portraits of political figures and military generals are displayed in the US state capitol buildings of Tennessee, Alabama, Mississippi, and Louisiana. Her mother was Maude McGehee. Hank Hankins married Walter A. Fort at age 19, in 1928, taking his name; they later divorced. Her second marriage, in 1964, was to Bill McAuliffe, an investment broker.

Career
Fort was a singer and songwriter. She composed over 400 songs. Her song "Put Your Shoes On, Lucy" was recorded by Petula Clark in 1949, and by Anne Shelton in 1952. Among others, "I Didn't Know the Gun Was Loaded" was a minor hit for The Andrews Sisters. In 1958 Fort released an album on Epic Records, Hank Fort Sings and Plays Her Own Songs which included such ditties as "Save Your Confederate Money, Boys" and "You Can't Hurt Me Now Cause I'm Daid". One of Fort's songs, "Look With Pride On Our Flag", dedicated to President Richard Nixon, was played at his 1973 inauguration ceremony, eight days after Fort's death.

"Fortnightly"

In 1935, Fort created a ballroom dancing class for youth in Nashville called "Fortnightly". The lessons became a tradition of teaching dance along with the social niceties of the ballroom to generations of Nashville youth. Fort joined with a business partner, Mrs. Martha Perkins Trousdale, and later Carol Woolwine to get the school going. Initially classes were at country clubs or Nashville's Parmer School; Fort came to terms with Albertine Maxwell to use her home at 3325 West End Avenue. The school endured for 23 years and was a well-known rite of passage for youngsters in the sixth, seventh and eighth grades. Some students thought "Fortnightly" was named for Mrs. Fort. She said, "It came as a shock to them that the name came from the twice-a-month meetings". Former student Tom Henderson, said, "An annual costume party held at the old Centennial Club on 8th Avenue for all pupils was the highlight of the year during that time and was the talk of the town". After Fort left Nashville for New York and Washington, the school continued operating and Fort commuted to Nashville at the beginning of the season and again for the masquerade ball at the end.

Death
Fort died on January 12, 1973, in Washington, D.C.

References

External links

 (I Didn't Know the Gun was Loaded song lyrics at Family Friendly Movies)

1908 births
1973 deaths
People from Nashville, Tennessee
American women songwriters
Songwriters from Tennessee
20th-century American women musicians
20th-century American musicians